The Aston Martin CC100 Speedster is a concept car produced by the British car company Aston Martin to celebrate its 100th anniversary, announced in May 2013 at the ADAC Zurich 24 Hours of Nürburgring race. Only two were produced and both were sold to very loyal customers. One of the owners plans to keep it in his private collection, while the owner of the second car plans to get regulatory approval so it can be driven on public roads.

Design
The CC100 is inspired by the 1950s DBR1 with an open split cockpit, cutaway doors and twin rear buttresses. It was designed by Miles Nurnberger and is built on Aston's VH platform, with a carbon fibre body designed and built at the company's headquarters in Gaydon.

References

External links
 

CC100